"All the world's a stage" is the phrase that begins a monologue from William Shakespeare's pastoral comedy As You Like It, spoken by the melancholy Jaques in Act II Scene VII Line 139. The speech compares the world to a stage and life to a play and catalogues the seven stages of a man's life, sometimes referred to as the seven ages of man.

Text

Origins

World as a stage
The comparison of the world to a stage and people to actors long predated Shakespeare. Richard Edwards' play Damon and Pythias, written in the year Shakespeare was born, contains the lines, "Pythagoras said that this world was like a stage / Whereon many play their parts; the lookers-on, the sage". When it was founded in 1599 Shakespeare's own theatre, The Globe, may have used the motto  (All the world plays the actor), the Latin text of which is derived from a 12th-century treatise.

In his own earlier work, The Merchant of Venice, Shakespeare also had one of his main characters, Antonio, comparing the world to a stage:

In his work The Praise of Folly, first printed in 1511, Renaissance humanist Erasmus asks, "For what else is the life of man but a kind of play in which men in various costumes perform until the director motions them off the stage."

Ages of man

Likewise the division of human life into a series of ages was a commonplace of art and literature, which Shakespeare would have expected his audiences to recognize. The number of ages varied: three and four being the most common among ancient writers such as Aristotle. The concept of seven ages derives from medieval philosophy, which constructed groups of seven, as in the seven deadly sins, for theological reasons. The seven ages model dates from the 12th century. King Henry V had a tapestry illustrating the seven ages of man.

According to T. W. Baldwin, Shakespeare's version of the concept of the ages of man is based primarily upon Pier Angelo Manzolli's  book Zodiacus Vitae, a school text he might have studied at the Stratford Grammar School, which also enumerates stages of human life. He also takes elements from Ovid and other sources known to him.

See also
 The Seven Ages of Man (painting series)
 Ages of Man
 Riddle of the Sphinx

References

External links

Human development
Monologues
Shakespearean phrases
As You Like It